This is the second season a team handball ranking for the women's clubs and the men's college exist and the third for men's clubs.

Legend

Men's Top 25

Source for missing records:

Women's Top 5

Collegiate Top 5
The record at the college ranking is only against other college teams.

References

Handball in the United States
College sports rankings in the United States